Kosharnoye is a rural locality (a settlement) in Grishevskoye Rural Settlement, Podgorensky District, Voronezh Oblast, Russia. The population was 62 as of 2010.

Geography 
Kosharnoye is located 25 km northwest of Podgorensky (the district's administrative centre) by road. Postoyaly is the nearest rural locality.

References 

Rural localities in Podgorensky District